Frank Ross (born December 23, 1977), better known by his stage name Nitty, is an American hip hop recording artist from The Bronx, New York. He is perhaps best known for his single "Nasty Girl" and his pop rap style of hip hop, which he calls "playboy rap".

Career
His singles include "Nasty Girl" and "Hey Bitty", the former reaching No. 1 in sales in the United States in October 2004, and also debuting at No. 1 in Australia in 2005. The following album, Player's Paradise, was released in 2005.

In an interview with the former Australian music television show So Fresh, Nitty explained that he did not want to jump into rap as a mean, edgy type of rapper that is the current trend, but more of a nice-guy rapper, with lighthearted songs and videos. He calls this style "playboy rap".

Since Player's Paradise, Nitty has gone on to continue his career as a producer. He is currently an independent artist. In the recent film Sex Drive, his song "Nasty Girl" was on the soundtrack.

Discography

Albums
It's Not a Game (2004)
Player's Paradise (2005)
 Let's Get Nasty (2009)
 NiteLife (2012)

Singles

References

External links
 Official website
 Official SoundCloud

1977 births
Living people
African-American male rappers
African-American songwriters
East Coast hip hop musicians
Pop rappers
Rappers from the Bronx
Songwriters from New York (state)
21st-century American rappers
21st-century American male musicians
21st-century African-American musicians
20th-century African-American people
American male songwriters